Héctor Rojas Herazo (August 12, 1920 – April 11, 2002) was a Colombian novelist, poet, journalist and painter.

Rojas was born in Tolú as son of Juan Emiro Rojas and Blance Berta Herazo. He was baptized on October 6, 1921. He started artistic works in his childhood and was taught in plastic arts by his cousin José Manuel González. Later he wrote as journalist for several papers. As painter he realized more than sixty exhibitions on the American and the European continent. He died in Bogotá.

Publications
 Rostro en la soledad, poetry, 1952
 Desde la luz preguntan por nosotros, 1952
 Tránsito de Caín, poetry, 1953
 Desde la luz preguntan por nosotros, poetry, 1956
 Agresión de las formas contra el ángel, poetry, 1961
 Respirando el verano, novel, 1962
 En noviembre llega el arzobispo, novel, 1966
 Márquez’s One Hundred Years of Solitude
 Señales y garabatos del habitante, novel, 1976
 Celia se pudre, novel, 1985
 Las úlceras de Adán, novel, 1995

Honors
 Honorary doctor of the Universidad de Cartagena, 1997
 Commander of the Medal of the Congress of the Republic of Colombia, 1991
 ProArtes literary merit medal, 1995 and 1998 (Cruz de Boyacá)
 Golden Francisco Antonio Zea order of merit, Universidad de Antioquia, 1998
 National José Asunción Silva poetry award, Bogotá, 1999
 Medal of merits of the Universidad Santo Tomás de Aquino

References

External links
 
 
 Juan Manuel Roca: Héctor Rojas Herazo, September 7, 2006

Colombian male writers
1920 births
2002 deaths
People from Sucre Department
20th-century Colombian painters
20th-century Colombian male artists
Colombian male painters